The Dumb Bunnies is a series of books created by Dav Pilkey, the author of Captain Underpants, under the pseudonym "Sue Denim". They involve the adventures of a dumb family of bunnies. The Dumb Bunnies did everything in reverse, including sleeping under beds and putting flowers upside down in vases.

The series is said to be mocking or parodying books like Good Night Moon by Margaret Wise Brown and The Stupids Step Out by Harry G. Allard and illustrated by James Marshall.

Book appearances
The Dumb Bunnies first appeared in the book The Dumb Bunnies. In the book the Dumb Bunnies are having porridge when they decide to go for a walk. They go to Kentucky Fried Carrots (parody of Kentucky Fried Chicken) and have a picnic in the car wash. Meanwhile, Little Red Goldilocks enters their home. When the Dumb Bunnies return, they are thrilled to see her. But Poppa Bunny is embarrassed because he thought someone slept on his porridge. Momma Bunny is angry because she thought someone ate her bed. Baby Bunny cries because he thinks someone used his pimple cream. Then Papa Bunny dances, Mama Bunny sings a song, and Baby Bunny flushes Little Red Goldilocks down the toilet. At the end of the book, a picture on the back cover shows her coming out of a sewer pipe and landing in a lake. Note: The cover originally had the word "spam" on the bowl of porridge, which Pilkey claims was meant to be a joke, until the Hormel Foods Corporation threatened legal action, causing either a recall of the book or placing a golden sticker on it until a reprint was made without the word. The Spam covers have now become extremely hard to find.

The Dumb Bunnies made their second appearance in the book The Dumb Bunnies Easter. The Dumb Bunnies are preparing for Easter (which appears to be more related to Christmas) and set up the decorations (including putting an "Easter Tree" upside down). After preparing, they spray-paint fried eggs (claimed to be "painting Easter Eggs") and watch a small football on top of their television. They go to hang up their stockings before they realize that they are wearing them and they are sleeping upside down in front of the fireplace. The Easter Bunny soon arrives and drops all the eggs down the chimney. The next morning, the Dumb Bunnies are thrilled to see the eggs (although they are completely cracked with shells lying everywhere).

Their third appearance was in the book Make Way for Dumb Bunnies. While the Dumb Bunnies are spending quality time at home, it suddenly starts raining. They think it is a perfect day to go to the beach and they head there. But then the sun comes out and they think it is bad weather, so they head to the movie theater (accidentally stealing a car in the process). During the movie, the Dumb Bunnies think the projector is the screen, which blinds them for a while. They return home on a steamroller (which they thought was their car) and regain vision again.

The Dumb Bunnies latest appearance is in the book The Dumb Bunnies Go to the Zoo. They first go outside to pick things in their garden (using pickaxes). They later drive to the zoo, only to discover the animals they are seeing are a lot smaller than they really are (they mistake a small bird perched on the "Elephant" sign as being the elephant and a butterfly perched on the "Lion" sign as being the lion). When the butterfly flutters off the sign they think the lion escaped and go crazy all over the zoo and letting all the animals loose (including the "real" lion). The S.W.A.T. cops arrive to capture the lion, but the Dumb Bunnies say he flew away. As they leave the zoo (the book says that they decide to go home, but they really got kicked out by the zookeeper), they come across two giant apes which they mistake for being "Free Kitties" (the box that the words were written on did contain real kittens, but when the apes climbed over the wall, they scared all the kittens, and the owner who carried the box, away). Baby Bunny decides to keep them, but as they drive out, the apes fall off the top of the car they had been tied to. They return home at the end of the day and get into their new waterbed (with a series of hoses spraying water on the bed) and fall asleep.

Challenges 
In 2010, The Dumb Bunnies Go to the Zoo was placed on the "Most Challenged Books of 2010" list that was published by the Canadian Library Association. Again, this particular book was challenged – this time in Oregon for "concern that reading this book may result in confusion and stupidity." The book was retained in the library.

Because of the "sarcastic view of humor", the series was challenged in Summit County and was moved out the primary library and into the intermediate library.

The original book was challenged in Texas because of parent complaints that the book depicted violence.

Books
 The Dumb Bunnies (1994, Blue Sky Press)
 The Dumb Bunnies' Easter (1995, Blue Sky Press)
 Make Way for Dumb Bunnies (1996, Blue Sky Press)
 The Dumb Bunnies Go to the Zoo (1997, Blue Sky Press)

Television series 

It was also adapted into an animated television series produced by Nelvana and Yoram Gross, airing on CBS in the U.S.  The show ran for 26 episodes, from October 3, 1998 to March 27, 1999. In Australia, the show ran on Seven Network.

Episodes

References

External links

Dumb Bunnies on STV Player

1994 children's books
Children's fiction books
Series of children's books
Books about rabbits and hares
Books about families
Works by Dav Pilkey
1990s Australian animated television series
1998 Australian television series debuts
1999 Australian television series endings
1990s Canadian animated television series
1998 Canadian television series debuts
1999 Canadian television series endings
Australian children's animated comedy television series
Australian television shows based on children's books
Canadian children's animated comedy television series
Canadian television shows based on children's books
Television series based on books by Dav Pilkey
YTV (Canadian TV channel) original programming
CBS original programming
Animated television series about rabbits and hares
Animated television series about families
Television series by Nelvana